The Minister for Multiculturalism is a minister of the Government of New South Wales with responsibility for social policy and welfare, including multiculturalism in the state of New South Wales, Australia.

The Minister since 21 December 2021 is Mark Coure, who also holds the Seniors portfolio.

The Minister assists the Minister for Families, Communities and Disability Services administer her portfolio through the  Stronger Communities cluster, in particular through the Department of Communities and Justice and a range of other government agencies.

List of ministers

Former ministerial titles

Assisting ministers

See also 

List of New South Wales government agencies

References

Multiculturalism